Andras Podpinka is a male former international table tennis player from Belgium.

Table tennis career
He won a silver medal at the 2001 World Table Tennis Championships in the Swaythling Cup (men's team event) with Martin Bratanov, Marc Closset, Jean-Michel Saive and Philippe Saive for Belgium.

Personal life
Andras Podpinka is a nephew of the Hungarian table tennis player Tibor Klampár.

See also
 List of table tennis players
 List of World Table Tennis Championships medalists

References

Belgian male table tennis players
Hungarian male table tennis players
1968 births
Living people
World Table Tennis Championships medalists
Table tennis players from Budapest